Citricultores, hailing from Matanzas Province, won the 16th Cuban National Series by a slim margin over Vegueros (Pinar del Río Province) and Metropolitanos (Havana).

Standings

References

 (Note - text is printed in a white font on a white background, depending on browser used.)

Cuban National Series seasons
Base
1977 in baseball
1977 in Cuban sport